Demshar-e Khurgu (also Romanized as Demshar-e Khūrgū; also known as Dar-e Shahrū, Dar Shīrū, Khorgū, Khowrgū, Khurgu, Khvorgū, Shahroo, and Shahrū) is a village in Isin Rural District, in the Central District of Bandar Abbas County, Hormozgan Province, Iran. At the 2006 census, its population was 31, in 9 families.

References 

Populated places in Bandar Abbas County